Denmark is one of the major teams in international speedway. They are managed by Denmark's most successful speedway rider, four time Individual World Champion Hans Nielsen and the current captain is Niels-Kristian Iversen. They have won the Speedway World Cup / Speedway World Team Cup a record 15 occasions with team manager Nielsen being a rider on 11 of those teams.

Speedway World Cup 
The Denmark national speedway were a major force throughout the 1980s, winning a record 6 world titles in a row, between 1983 and 1988. They are currently one of the best teams in the world. Key riding members of the title wins include Hans Nielsen, who holds the record for most world cup wins by an individual rider with 11 wins (Nielsen won a total of 22 Individual, Pairs and Team World Championships), Tommy Knudsen (8 wins), Erik Gundersen (7 wins), Jan O. Pedersen (4 wins), Ole Olsen and Finn Thomsen (both 3 wins).

Denmark are the current (2014) Speedway World Cup Champions having won their record 15th title on 2 August at the Polonia Bydgoszcz Stadium in Bydgoszcz, Poland.

Team U-21 World Championship

Honours

World Championships

European Championships

Famous Danish riders 

 Hans Andersen
 Erik Gundersen
 Tommy Knudsen
 Hans Nielsen
 Ole Olsen
 Bjarne Pedersen
 Jan O. Pedersen
 Nicki Pedersen
 Bo Petersen
 Finn Thomsen

See also 
 motorcycle speedway

National speedway teams
Speedway
Team
!